Olszynka is a district of Gdańsk, Poland.

Olszynka may also refer to the following places:
Olszynka, Podlaskie Voivodeship (north-east Poland)
Olszynka, West Pomeranian Voivodeship (north-west Poland)
Olszynka, Opole Voivodeship (south-west Poland)
Olszynka, Warmian-Masurian Voivodeship (north Poland)

See also